Harkonen may refer to:
Härkönen (surname), a Finnish surname
Harkonen (band), a post-hardcore American band

See also
 Harkonnen (disambiguation)